The Dayton-Wright XO-3 was an aircraft project developed by Dayton-Wright in 1924.

Design and development
A contemporary of the successful Douglas O-2, it was an orthodox two seat biplane, powered by a  Wright T-3 V12 engine. The prototype, numbered 23-1254, built by Wright Aeronautical after the demise of Dayton-wright, was allocated the Wright field number P-376.

Operational history
After trials at Wright Field the XO-3 was rejected and returned to Wright Aeronautical, where it saw service as an engine test-bed, primarily for the Wright R-1750 Cyclone, with the civil registration X-1087. Officially it was named Mohawk by Wright, but unofficially it received the sobriquet Iron Horse.

Specifications (XO-3)

References

Biplanes
XO-3
Single-engined tractor aircraft